Alexander Lamont Stewart (2 June 1858 – 17 February 1904) was an English first-class cricketer.

Stewart was educated at Clifton College. active 1880–84 who played for Middlesex and Oxford University. He was born in Port of Spain, educated at Clifton College and St Edmund Hall, Oxford, and died in Marylebone.

References

1858 births
1904 deaths
English cricketers
Middlesex cricketers
Oxford University cricketers
People educated at Clifton College
Alumni of St Edmund Hall, Oxford